Biase is a Local Government Area of Cross River State, Nigeria. Its headquarters are in the town of Akpet Central. It has an area of 1,310 km2 and a population of 169,183 at the 2006 census.

The postal code of the area is 542.

References

Local Government Areas in Cross River State